Mozaffari-ye Jonubi (also Romanized as Moz̧affarī-ye Jonūbī; also known as Moz̧affarī) is a village in Liravi-ye Shomali Rural District, in the Central District of Deylam County, Bushehr Province, Iran. At the 2006 census, its population was 17, in 5 families.

References 

Populated places in Deylam County